Oblivion is a 2013 American post-apocalyptic action-adventure film produced and directed by Joseph Kosinski from a screenplay by Karl Gajdusek and Michael deBruyn, starring Tom Cruise in the main role alongside Morgan Freeman, Olga Kurylenko, Andrea Riseborough, Nikolaj Coster-Waldau and Melissa Leo in supporting roles. Based on Kosinski's unpublished graphic novel of the same name, the film pays homage to 1970s sci-fi and is a love story set in 2077 on an Earth desolated by an alien war; a maintenance technician on the verge of completing his mission finds a woman who survived from a space ship crash, leading him to question his purpose and discover the truth about the war.

Oblivion premiered in Buenos Aires on March 26, 2013 and was released in theaters by Universal Pictures on April 19. The film grossed $286 million worldwide on a production budget of $120 million and received mixed reviews from critics.

Plot

Jack and Victoria are the last ones left on Earth in 2077. In 2017, scavenger aliens destroyed the Moon and invaded Earth; although humans won the war, Earth was left uninhabitable. With Victoria as his communications officer, Jack repairs combat drones that hunt the remaining scavengers and guard the hydrothermal platforms that convert seawater into fusion energy. The work is reported to Sally, the mission commander aboard the "Tet", a space station orbiting Earth once a day. Within two weeks, the group will be departing for Saturn's moon, Titan, to join surviving colonists there. Though Jack and Victoria's memories have been wiped, Jack dreams of a pre-war life with an unknown woman.

Jack escapes a scavenger trap while searching for a disabled drone inside the New York Public Library's ruins; meanwhile, a platform is destroyed. Jack discovers that the scavengers are radioing coordinates from the Empire State Building's antenna and ends the transmission to outer space. He follows nearby waterfalls to visit a secret area that sustains vegetation and has a lake with fish and potable water. A lakeside cabin he built is filled with mementos of Earth's past. 

An unidentified object falls from the sky to the transmitted coordinates. Jack finds five humans in sleep pods there, including the woman in his dreams. A drone destroys four pods but Jack saves the woman and takes her to his and Victoria's aerial base. The woman, Julia Rusakova, revives and says she is a NASA astronaut who has been sleeping aboard the Odyssey space ship since 2017.

Jack and Julia return to the crash to retrieve the Odyssey's flight recorder, but scavengers capture and take them to the Raven Rock Mountain Complex. The leader, Malcolm Beech, reveals that the scavengers are disguised human survivors hiding from the drones. Beech frees Jack and Julia into the desert area that Jack knows as the deadly Radiation Zone so that they can discover the truth for themselves. Julia reveals that she is Jack's wife, which triggers his memory of proposing to her at the Empire State Building.

Victoria sends an aircraft to retrieve Jack and Julia. She is heartbroken at seeing their closeness and reports to Sally that she and Jack are no longer "an effective team". Sally dispatches a drone that kills Victoria. Jack and Julia flee in the jet and destroy the drones chasing them but they crash in the desert, where a clone of Jack arrives to fix disabled drones. Jack incapacitates him, but Julia is shot during their fight. Jack impersonates the clone to return to its base for medical supplies; there he encounters a clone of Victoria. Jack then takes Julia to his cabin where she recovers. She tells him that the cabin resembles the one they had in 2017.

The two spend the night together. The next morning, they go back to Raven Rock, intending to return to the cabin once the war is over. Beech tells them the Tet is an alien ship with an artificial intelligence that is extracting Earth's natural resources. The Tet destroyed the Moon, causing planet-wide catastrophic earthquakes and tsunamis, then invaded with an army of Jack clones. The escape to Titan and humanity's victory are fictional. The survivors had to bring down the Odyssey spaceship to obtain its nuclear reactor, which is suitable for interplanetary travel. Jack reprograms a captured drone to sabotage the Tet with a bomb, but other drones attack the base. Beech is gravely injured and the captured drone is damaged beyond repair. Jack and Julia volunteer to manually deliver a bomb to the Tet.

En route to the Tet, Jack learns from the Odyssey's flight recorder that he was cloned from the NASA mission commander, Jack Harper, who was on a mission to explore Titan. Victoria was his co-pilot, Julia a crew member and Sally the Earth mission director. After the mission was interrupted by the Tet's arrival, Jack separated the control capsule to save the crew members in their stasis pods. He and Victoria were captured and cloned.

Jack enters the Tet and discovers thousands of clones of him and Victoria in stasis. The Tet's projection of Sally confronts Jack. Jack offers Julia to Sally, but it is Beech who emerges from the pod. The two detonate the bomb, destroying the Tet and themselves. Meanwhile, Julia awakens in her pod by the cabin. She is on the side of the canvas from the Christina's World painting she and Jack saw in Raven Rock.

Three years after the explosion seen in the sky, Julia and Jack's daughter is living at the cabin with her mother. Julia kept the painting framed in the cabin, cultivated an orchard and built a wooden boat. One day, surviving resistance members arrive with the help of the clone that Jack had previously subdued in the desert. The impassioned clone recovered the original Jack's memories as well.

Cast
 Tom Cruise as Jack Harper—Tech 49, a technician who works to repair drones on Earth and questions his mission. Originally, he was the American commander of a mission en route to Titan who was captured by the Tet and cloned to fight humanity. Cruise also plays Jack Harper—Tech 52, a clone who initially remains loyal to the Tet.
 Morgan Freeman as Malcolm Beech, an American veteran soldier and leader of a large community of scavengers, the human survivors of the alien Tet's attacks.
 Olga Kurylenko as Julia Rusakova Harper, Jack's wife and a Russian crew member on the Odyssey, who was sent back towards Earth by her husband to protect her from the initial contact with the Tet.
 Andrea Riseborough as Victoria "Vika" Olsen, Jack's communications partner and housemate. Originally, she was the British co-pilot of Jack's mission to Titan who was captured and cloned to assist in the Tet's war on humanity. Riseborough also plays a clone of Vika who Jack misleads to obtain medical supplies.
 Nikolaj Coster-Waldau as Sergeant Sykes, the main military commander of Beech's community of scavengers who is skeptical of Jack at first.
 Melissa Leo as the Tet, an alien artificial intelligence seeking to acquire Earth's natural resources and wipe out humanity. Leo also plays Sally, the mission director of Jack and Julia's mission to Titan; her likeness was copied by the Tet to serve as its visual and auditory representation.
 Zoë Bell as Kara, a soldier and member of the scavengers.

Production

Development

Joseph Kosinski wanted to film a cinematic adaptation of the graphic novel Oblivion, which he started to co-write with Arvid Nelson for Radical Comics. The novel was never finished; Kosinski said it was "just a stage in the project [of film development]". He said that "partnership with Radical Comics allowed me to continue working on the story by developing a series of images and continuing to refine the story more over a period of years. Then I basically used all that development as a pitch kit to the studio. So even though we really never released it as an illustrated novel the story is being told as a film, which was always the intention."

Walt Disney Pictures, which produced Kosinski's previous film Tron: Legacy (2010), acquired the Oblivion film adaptation rights from Radical Comics and Kosinski after a heated auction in August 2010. The film was a directing vehicle for Kosinski, with Barry Levine producing, and Jesse Berger executive producing. Other studios that made bids on the film were Paramount Pictures, 20th Century Fox, and Universal Pictures. Disney subsequently released the rights after realizing the PG-rated film they envisioned, in line with their family-oriented reputation, would require too many story changes. Universal, which had also bid for the original rights, then bought them from Kosinski and Radical and authorized a PG-13 film version.

The film's script was originally written by Kosinski and William Monahan and underwent a first rewrite by Karl Gajdusek. When the film passed into Universal's hands, a final rewrite was done by Michael Arndt, under the pen name "Michael deBruyn". Universal was particularly appreciative of the script, saying, "It's one of the most beautiful scripts we've ever come across."

The Bubble Ship operated by Cruise's main character, Jack 49, was inspired by the Bell 47 helicopter (often colloquially referred to as a "bubble cockpit" helicopter), a utilitarian 1947 vehicle with a transparent round canopy that Kosinski saw in the lobby of the Museum of Modern Art in Manhattan, and which he likened to a dragonfly. Daniel Simon, who previously worked with Kosinski as the lead vehicle designer on Tron: Legacy, was tasked with creating the Bubble Ship from this basis, incorporating elements evocative of an advanced fighter jet with the Bell 47 to create a light, functional vehicle that was both practical and aesthetically pleasing, much as he observed with the ships in Stanley Kubrick's 2001: A Space Odyssey (1968).

"When Kubrick made 2001, rather than going to the hotshot concept designers of the day, he hired NASA engineers", said Simon. "I believe in form follows function. I'm not a fan of excessive decoration, of putting fins on something because it looks cool". Elements of the cockpit, such as the placement of the joystick and pedals, were customized for Cruise, who is a qualified pilot, and who had some input into the design. The craft was also made to be easy to disassemble and assemble, to facilitate transport to Iceland shooting locations, where it would be mounted on a gimbal for shots of it flying. The unmanned aerial drones that were featured prominently in the plot were created to appear to be in the same design family as the Bubble Ship.

Casting
Tom Cruise had expressed interest in the film for a long time, and officially committed to it on May 20, 2011.

For casting the lead role of Julia opposite Cruise, the producers considered five actresses: Jessica Chastain, Olivia Wilde, Brit Marling, Noomi Rapace and Olga Kurylenko, and all five auditioned on August 27, 2011. On September 26, 2011, it was announced that Chastain had been cast. Chastain was subsequently offered the lead role in the Kathryn Bigelow film Zero Dark Thirty (2012) and Cruise let her be released from her contract for Oblivion to make the other film, for which Chastain has publicly thanked Cruise. The role was later recast with Kurylenko.

In preparation for the role, Kurylenko watched astronaut training videos as well as classic science fiction and romance films, such as Solaris (1972), Notorious (1946), and Casablanca (1942. "What's funny is I actually watched Solaris; Joseph never brought it up", said Kurylenko. "I come from Tarkovsky-land, and at that point I hadn't watched it for many years. I watched the new one as well, with George Clooney and Natascha McElhone. The story – both in Solaris and Oblivion – deals with space and memory."

For the other leading role, Victoria, the producers initially considered Hayley Atwell, Diane Kruger and Kate Beckinsale. The three actresses traveled to Pittsburgh to screen-test with Cruise, who was filming Jack Reacher (2012). The role finally went to Andrea Riseborough. Melissa Leo was cast at a later date as Sally.

Filming
Production began on March 12, 2012, and concluded on July 14, 2012. Filming locations included Baton Rouge and New Orleans, Louisiana. Out of approximately three months of shooting, 69 days were shot in Louisiana, from March through May 2012, 11 days were shot in New York in June 2012, a few in Mammoth in California in June 2012, and 10 days were filmed in Iceland in June 2012, when the daylight lasts for nearly 24 hours a day. As well as showcasing Iceland's volcanic landscapes, the film's director Joseph Kosinski sought to take advantage of the round-the-clock light, in particular the 6pm to 1am waning light known as "magic hour", to "bring sci-fi out into the daylight", in contrast with films such as Alien, which spent their time in dark hulls or benighted planets.

The single most difficult scene to film was when Harper takes a break to admire the view and waters a flower. It was filmed by having Cruise sit next to an  drop at the top of Iceland's Jarlhettur on the root of Langjökull, which is accessible only by helicopter. The scenes set at Harper's idyllic forest retreat were filmed at Black's Pond in June Lake, California.

Oblivion was filmed with Sony's CineAlta F65 camera, which was shipped in January 2012. A Red Epic was also used for scenes that required going handheld or when body mount rigging was applied. The film was shot in 4K resolution in Sony's proprietary raw image format, but for cost reasons (and over Kosinski's protests), both the digital intermediate and final version were done at 2K resolution.

For the Sky Tower set (built on a soundstage in Baton Rouge), Kosinski and cinematographer Claudio Miranda worked closely with visual special-effects house Pixomondo to establish both environment and lighting by the use of 21 front-screen projectors aimed at a huge wraparound backdrop to form one continuous image, rather than blue screen backdrops. The backdrop consisted of a single seamless piece of painted white muslin, which was wrapped around the set for 270-degree coverage. This enabled the full environment to be captured in camera, and assisted in lighting up to 90 percent of the set.

Had blue screen been used on the "glass house" Sky Tower, the glass would have disappeared into the blue lighting, and would have had to be reproduced digitally in post-production. The actors enjoyed working in the environment, as they could look outside and actually see the sunrise or sunset imagery. This new technique allowed them to cut down on both the effects shots, which ended up at around 800 in total, and the expenses. Even the "control table" which Victoria operates was filmed then displayed on a large screen.

To obtain the necessary footage to create the illusion that the Sky Tower set was sitting high above the clouds, Pixomondo sent a crew to film the view from the peak of Haleakalā in Hawaii for four days with three Red Epic cameras mounted side by side on a single rig. Pixomondo's Stuttgart office then stitched together the data from the three cameras to form a single gigantic video stream (with each still image consisting of 26 megapixels) and produced a variety of different time-of-day clips to be projected on the set.

Music
On June 28, 2012, it was announced that French electronic act M83, comprised solely of Anthony Gonzalez, would compose the soundtrack for Oblivion. On why he chose M83 to score the film, director Joseph Kosinski said, "I went back and I found my first treatment for Oblivion from 2005 and it had listed in the treatment a soundtrack of M83. Obviously, the Tron: Legacy collaboration with Daft Punk worked out as good as I would have ever hoped, [so] I wanted to do something similar in that I'm pulling an artist from outside the movie business to create an original sound for this film." Kosinski continued, "Daft Punk's music wouldn't make sense for this movie. It had to be an artist whose music fit the themes and story I was trying to tell. And M83's music I felt was fresh and original, and big and epic, but at the same time emotional and this is a very emotional film and it felt like a good fit."

To guide Gonzalez through the scoring process, Kosinski brought in Joseph Trapanese, who co-wrote the score alongside Gonzalez. Kosinski states, "Together they have created the score that I have dreamed about since I first put this story down on paper eight years ago." Trapanese first came to Kosinski's attention when he collaborated with Daft Punk on Tron: Legacy as arranger and orchestrator.

In an interview with Rolling Stone, Gonzalez said, "I started to write the soundtrack just reading the script, and then when you get the picture in, it's different, and you kind of switch to another vibe and change stuff and start experimenting a lot with the music." Gonzalez added, "I worked with Joseph a lot, and he's very particular about the music in his movies, so we spent a lot of time talking about music and working the arrangements together."

Back Lot Music released the soundtrack on April 9, 2013. A deluxe edition of the soundtrack was released the same day exclusively through iTunes. It features an additional 13 tracks. The soundtrack featured original music by M83, along with music composed by Gonzalez and Trapanese. The lyrics to "Oblivion" were written by Gonzalez and Susanne Sundfør. Metacritic rated the soundtrack 55/100.

Distribution

Marketing
Details about Oblivion were kept secret, though the studio was said to have been "very excited" about the film. Promotions began in April 2012, with a part of the footage being screened at the 2012 CinemaCon even though filming had begun just one month before the event. The footage was described as "a combination of early concept art, rough animation, and unfinished dailies", showcasing a glimpse of the film's landscapes.

Theatrical release
Oblivion was first presented in Buenos Aires on March 26, 2013, Dublin on April 3, and in Hollywood on April 10 at the Dolby Theatre where Cruise himself announced before the screening that the film was actually the first feature to be mixed completely "from start to finish" in the latest state-of-the-art Dolby Atmos surround sound.

Home media
The DVD and Blu-ray for Oblivion became available online for pre-order in North America on April 24, 2013, just five days after its initial release in the region. One month later it was announced that the United Kingdom branch of Universal Studios would be releasing the film on home video in its region on August 6, 2013, with the on-demand version on August 18, 2013. The release was scheduled to be in both a standard and a SteelBook Limited Edition form. In June 2013, it was announced that the film would be released on home video in America also on August 6, 2013. The Blu-ray releases will feature commentary with Tom Cruise and director Joseph Kosinski, deleted scenes, M83's isolated score, and a series of making-of featurettes. The Blu-ray debuted at number 1 in sales for its opening week.
On August 9, 2016, a 4K Blu-Ray edition was released.

Release
In North America, the film earned US$37.1 million on its opening weekend, including US$5.5 million from IMAX screenings in 323 theaters, making it Cruise's best North American opening after Mission: Impossible film series and War of the Worlds.

The film closed on June 27, 2013. Oblivion grossed US$89.1 million in the U.S. and US$198.8 million internationally, bringing the worldwide total to US$287.9 million.

Reception
On review aggregation website Rotten Tomatoes, the film has an approval rating of 53% based on 255 reviews and an average score of 5.88/10. The site's critical consensus reads, "Visually striking but thinly scripted, Oblivion benefits greatly from its strong production values and an excellent performance from Tom Cruise." Metacritic gives the film a score of 54 out of 100 based on 41 critics, indicating "mixed or average reviews".

Todd McCarthy of The Hollywood Reporter stated "Oblivion is an absolutely gorgeous film dramatically caught between its aspirations for poetic romanticism and the demands of heavy sci-fi action". Justin Chang of Variety said "Insofar as Oblivion is first and foremost a visual experience, a movie to be seen rather than a puzzle to be deciphered, its chief pleasures are essentially spoiler-proof." Kevin Harley of Total Film gave the film three stars and said "It isn't a reboot or reimagining, refreshingly, but Oblivion plays like a stylised remix of superior sci-fi ground-breakers". Andrew O'Hehir of Salon praised it as a "sly, surprising and visually magnificent Tom Cruise vehicle that has forced me – and many other people, I suspect – to revise my first opinion of director Joseph Kosinski."

Tasha Robinson from The A.V. Club states that an "unsettling sense of not-quite-right coats all of the film's steely surfaces, and Kosinski and his co-writers give audiences plenty of time to absorb the unease and gear up for the action". Some reviewers noted the filmmakers' ambition. James Berardinelli of ReelViews calls the film "imperfect but some of its imperfections result from being overly ambitious". Bill Goodykoontz from the Arizona Republic states that the film "may not live up fully to its grand ambitions, but it isn't for lack of trying". Jake Coyle of the Associated Press states that "[f]or those who enjoy the simple thrill of handsomely stylized image-making, Oblivion is mostly mesmerizing." Alan Scherstuhl from the Village Voice states that "Kosinski proves himself talented in ways his Tron: Legacy didn't suggest."

Kenneth Turan from the Los Angeles Times called the film "[m]ore adventurous than your typical Hollywood tent pole, Oblivion makes you remember why science fiction movies pulled you in way back when and didn't let you go." Michael O'Sullivan of The Washington Post states that "[i]f you're able to forgive and forget, Oblivion isn't a bad place to start loving Tom Cruise all over again." Steven Rea of The Philadelphia Inquirer states that "[Cruise] oversees some pretty impressive stuff here, from the drones that ping-pong around in the air to the bubbleship that Jack uses to go to and fro to that awesome house with its panoramic views." Peter Howell of the Toronto Star states that the film "gives us stars in the cast, stars in our eyes and it even tweaks a brain cell or three".

Colin Covert from the Minneapolis Star Tribune states that the "film is rife with elements from its finest predecessors – Kubrick, Lucas, the Wachowskis, and Pixar could be listed as creative consultants – but it has the spirit of a love letter to classic sci-fi, not an opportunistic mash-up". Cary Darling of the Fort Worth Star-Telegram states that the film is "stitched together from spare bits of other, often better films, stumbl[ing] awkwardly in story and plot, shuffling toward the predictable explosions and fireballs of the third act. Yet... Oblivion is so beautiful to look at."

Richard Corliss of TIME stated that "[i]n space, Jack [Harper] hopes, someone may hear you dream. But in a movie theater, no one will see you yawn." Anthony Lane of The New Yorker states that the film "[f]eels ever more grounded and stuck." Richard Roeper of Richard Roeper.com called it the "sci-fi movie equivalent of a pretty damn good cover band". Tom Charity of CNN.com called it "[g]lossy, derivative, ambitious and fatally underpowered." J. R. Jones of the Chicago Reader states that the "story eventually devolves into a grab bag of sci-fi tropes but, as with so many other Cruise productions, the sheer scale of everything is so mind-numbing that you may not notice". Rick Groen of Canada's The Globe and Mail called it "an okay blockbuster, a multimillion-dollar exercise in competence".

Tom Long of the Detroit News states that "Kosinski offers plenty of action here, and he lets the plot reveals bleed out slowly (explanations keep coming right to the end)." Long states that "a great deal is derivative, but it's fast-moving derivative". Stephen Whitty of the Newark Star-Ledger states that the movie "combines a lot of different films, yet somehow remains less than the sum of its parts". Claudia Puig of USA Today states that "Kosinski focuses on cool visuals but stints on a compelling plot. It's a dazzler, but the story lacks the impact of the futuristic look." Joe Morgenstern of The Wall Street Journal states that the "mystery posed by Oblivion as a whole is why its mysteries are posed so clumsily and worked out so murkily".

Manohla Dargis of The New York Times states that the "agony of being a longtime Tom Cruise fan has always been a burden, but now it's just, well, dispiriting". Rafer Guzman of Newsday states that "[p]laying spot-the-influence is the most fun you'll have during this expensive-looking, slow-moving plod through familiar territory." Joe Williams of the St. Louis Post-Dispatch states that "[i]nstead of developing characters, Kosinski pours most of his imagination into the annihilated landscapes and futuristic gadgetry." Michael Phillips of the Chicago Tribune states that "[w]hen you go to a futuristic, dystopian, post-apocalyptic barn dance starring Tom Cruise and his space guns, you expect a little zap with your thoughtful pauses." Peter Travers of Rolling Stone calls it "arid and antiseptic, untouched by human hands".

Rene Rodriguez of the Miami Herald states that the "filmmakers don't even have the courage to see the story to its proper end, opting for a ridiculous finale that feels vaguely insulting". Soren Anderson from The Seattle Times states that "[y]ou start wondering whether director Joseph Kosinski and screenwriters Karl Gajdusek and Michael DeBruyn have any original ideas of their own. And then you realize they don't." Randy Myers of the San Jose Mercury News states that the "mix of gee-whiz gadgetry and the day-to-day routineness of Jack and Victoria's lives is interesting enough, but the film is too glacially paced for it to work". Chris Nashawaty of Entertainment Weekly states that "[a]ll the eye candy in the world can't mask the sensation that you've seen this all before...and done better. Too bad the movie's script wasn't given the same attention as its sleek, brave-new-world look."

See also
 List of dystopian films
 List of films featuring drones
 List of films featuring space stations

References

External links

 
 
 
 
 
 
 

2013 films
2013 science fiction films
2013 science fiction action films
Alien invasions in films
American action adventure films
American science fiction action films
Films about cloning
Drone films
American dystopian films
Fiction about memory erasure and alteration
Films based on American comics
Films directed by Joseph Kosinski
Films produced by Peter Chernin
Films scored by Joseph Trapanese
Films set in 2077
Films set in New York City
Films shot in California
Films shot in Iceland
Films shot in Louisiana
Films shot in New Orleans
Films with screenplays by Michael Arndt
IMAX films
American post-apocalyptic films
Relativity Media films
Titan (moon) in film
Universal Pictures films
Chernin Entertainment films
2010s English-language films
2010s American films